MumbaiCSMT-Nagercoil Express runs between Chhatrapati Shivaji Maharaj Terminus (CSMT) railway station at Mumbai, Maharashtra, and  in Nagercoil, Tamil Nadu. Main cities on the way are Tirunelveli, Virudhunagar, Madurai, Salem, Katpadi, Pakala, Dharmavaram Anantapur, Guntakal, Adoni, Solapur, Pune, Lonavala, and Thane.  This train covers a distance of 1880 km.

Route

This train departs Nagercoil at early morning and travels through Tirunelveli, Madurai, Dindigul, Karur, Salem, Katpadi, Pakala, Dharmavaram, Guntakal, Wadi, Solapur, Pune, and reaches its destination Chhatrapati Shivaji Terminus (Mumbai CSMT) on next late evening.

Traction

This train is hauled by a Royapuram/ Erode-based WAP-7 from Nagercoil till Katpadi.

From Katpadi it is hauled by Kalyan-based WDP-4 / WDM-3D twins till its destination Chhatrapati Shivaji Terminus (Mumbai CSMT). This train will get reversed at Pakala in both the directions. Now the trains are running with end to end Electric loco

Coach composition

It has LHB rakes with a max speed of 130 kmph.
Maximum permissible speed: 110 km/hr

This train will be reversed at Pakala on both the directions.

It consist of 20 coaches:

 1 AC II Tier
 4 AC III Tier
 10 Sleeper coaches
 2 General Unreserved
 1 Pantry car
 2 EOG Generator Cars

See also
 Nagercoil Junction railway station
 Daund Junction railway station
 Renigunta Junction railway station
 Chhatrapati Shivaji Terminus railway station
 Indian Railways

References

Transport in Mumbai
Transport in Nagercoil
Express trains in India
Rail transport in Maharashtra
Rail transport in Tamil Nadu
Rail transport in Karnataka
Rail transport in Andhra Pradesh